Warialda State Conservation Area is a conservation area in New South Wales close to Warialda.

The conservation area is home to many species of plants, including Persoonia terminalis.

References

National parks of New South Wales
Protected areas established in 2005
2005 establishments in Australia